Fritz Herzog (6 December 1902 to 21 November 2001) was an American mathematician, known for his work in
complex analysis and power series.

He was born in Germany and studied at the University of Berlin until 1934 when he moved to United States.
He received his Ph.D. degree at Columbia University on a thesis entitled Systems of Algebraic Mixed Difference Equations
advised by Joseph Ritt (1934).
Herzog was an electrical engineering research associate at Cornell University (1938–43), working with
Michel G. Malti on dynamo research. Together they solved an important electric power problem on balancing dynamos, which had remained open since the days of Michael Faraday a century before.
Most of his career was spent at Michigan State University (1943–73) where he gave name to the
Fritz Herzog Prize Endowment Fund.
Herzog died at East Lansing of prostate cancer. 

He had a wife named Helen (née' Korngold) Herzog.

References

20th-century American mathematicians
20th-century German mathematicians
Columbia University alumni
Cornell University faculty
Michigan State University faculty
German emigrants to the United States
1902 births
2001 deaths
Deaths from cancer in Michigan